Salvador Joseph Poree (February 21, 1903 - January 1979) was a professional baseball pitcher in the Negro leagues. He played with the St. Louis Giants in 1921. He is also listed as Porsee in some sources.

References

External links
 and Seamheads

St. Louis Giants players
1903 births
1979 deaths
Baseball pitchers
Baseball players from Louisiana
20th-century African-American sportspeople